Rzeszow Power Station is a coal-fired thermal power station in Rzeszów, Poland. In first construction phase four 25 MWt generators were built between 1976 and 1983. To these were added two Sefako WP-120 generators with a total thermal capacity of 280 MWt between 1983 and 1988. Plans to install two BC-50 units were cancelled.  In 2003 one of the two WP-120 generators units was replaced by a gas-and-steam BGP-100 generator.

References

Coal-fired power stations in Poland
Natural gas-fired power stations in Poland
Power station